Robert Black may refer to:

Sports
 Robert Black (American football), American former head coach for the Sewanee college football team
 Robert Black (rugby player) (1893–1916), New Zealand rugby union player
 Bob Black (baseball) (1862–1933), American baseball player
 Bobby Black (Scottish footballer) (1927–2012), Scottish footballer
 Robert Black (rower) (born 1992), Australian rower

Writers
 Robert Black (author) (1829–1915), British author of fiction and nonfiction
 Robert Black, a pseudonym used by science fiction and fantasy author Robert Holdstock
 Bobby Black (journalist) (born 1973), American senior editor of High Times magazine

Musicians
 Robert Black (bassist) (born 1956), American double bass player in the Bang on a Can All-Stars
 Robert Black (conductor) (1950–1993), American conductor, composer and pianist, who also appeared in Bang on a Can events

Others
 Robert Black (Canadian politician) (born 1962), appointed to the Canadian Senate in 2018
 Robert Black (auditor), public administrator, first Auditor General for Scotland, 2000–2012
 Robert Black (advocate) (born 1947), professor emeritus of Scots law at the University of Edinburgh
 Robert Black (serial killer) (1947–2016), Scottish serial killer and sex offender
 Robert Black (colonial administrator) (1906–1999), Governor of Singapore and Hong Kong
 Robert Black (mayor) (1868–1938), mayor of Dunedin, 1929–1933
 Robert D. Black (born 1946), American professor of Renaissance history
 Robert Edward Black, American physician, epidemiologist, and global public health expert
 Robert P. Black (born 1927), Federal Reserve economist
 Robert S. Black (1860–1834), Australian mine manager
 Bob Black (born 1951), American anarchist and lawyer
 Rob Zicari (born 1974), aka Rob Black, American pornographer

See also
 Bobby Black (disambiguation)